Cristóbal Ramírez (died 1577) was a Spanish painter and illuminator of manuscripts for King Philip II of Spain. He was a native of Valencia, and did most of his work in his native city; he is known to have been active in 1566. He returned to el Escorial and died there, leaving his daughter and two sons under the king's protection. Among the books illuminated by this artist were the Oficio di difuntos, the Intonario, and the
Brevario Nuevo en Cantoria for the Escorial.

References

1577 deaths
People from Valencia
16th-century Spanish painters
Spanish male painters
Spanish Renaissance painters
Year of birth unknown